Curt Topper is the current Pennsylvania Secretary of General Services, having been nominated by Pennsylvania Governor Tom Wolf and confirmed in May 2015. Previously, he served as Pennsylvania Deputy Secretary of General Services for Procurement from 2003 until 2008.
Topper has a Bachelor of Arts in Political Science and Government from Brown University and a Master of Public Policy and Management from Carnegie Mellon University.

References

Living people
State cabinet secretaries of Pennsylvania
Brown University alumni
Carnegie Mellon University alumni
Year of birth missing (living people)